Hugh Poland may refer to:
 Hugh Poland (baseball) (1910–1984), American professional baseball catcher, manager and scout
 Hugh Poland (politician) (1868–1938), New Zealand Member of Parliament